Carex diandra is a species of sedge known by the common names lesser tussock-sedge and lesser panicled sedge.

Distribution
It is widely distributed in the Northern Hemisphere, where it can be found throughout North America, Europe, and Asia. It is also known from New Zealand. It grows in a wide variety of wet habitats, including wetlands, meadows, bogs, and lakeshores.

Description
This sedge produces clumps of triangular stems up to 90 centimeters long. The leaves have white-edged, red-dotted sheaths and are up to about 30 centimeters long. The inflorescence is simple or sometimes compound, made up of several clusters of stiff light brown spikes.

References

External links
Jepson Manual Treatment - Carex diandra
USDA Plants Profile
Flora of North America
Carex diandra: A Technical Conservation Assessment
Carex diandra - Photo gallery

diandra
Flora of North America
Flora of temperate Asia
Flora of Europe
Flora of New Zealand
Plants described in 1782